Kirill Andreyevich Ushatov (born 24 January 2000) is a Russian football player who plays for FC Yenisey Krasnoyarsk on loan from PFC Sochi.

Club career
Ushatov signed with Russian Premier League club PFC Sochi on 26 June 2022. He made his RPL debut for Sochi on 17 July 2022 in a game against FC Torpedo Moscow.

On 21 February 2023, Ushatov was loaned to FC Yenisey Krasnoyarsk until the end of the 2022–23 season, with an option to extend the loan.

Career statistics

References

External links
 
 
 
 

2000 births
Footballers from Moscow
Living people
Russian footballers
Association football midfielders
FC Olimp-Dolgoprudny players
PFC Sochi players
FC Yenisey Krasnoyarsk players
Russian Second League players
Russian Premier League players